Arget is a commune in the Pyrénées-Atlantiques department in the Nouvelle-Aquitaine region of south-western France.

The inhabitants of the commune are known as Argétois or Argétoises.

Geography
Arget is located some 18 km north-east of Orthez and 12 km south-east of Hagetmau on the border between Pyrénées-Atlantiques and Landes departments. It can be accessed by the D264 road from Montagut in the east passing through the commune and the village (of 2 buildings) and continuing south-west to Casteide-Candau. The commune has quite large areas of forest in the west but is mostly farmland.

Several streams rise in the commune with the Hourquet forming the north-western border as it flows north-east to join the Ruisseau de la Rance at the northern tip of the commune. The Rance forms the north-eastern border as it flows north-west. The south-eastern border also consists of an unnamed stream which joins the Rance just outside the eastern tip of the commune.

Places and hamlets

 Bayoc
 Boué
 Capère
 Carrèrot
 Castagnet
 Conte
 Cousnat
 Glaude
 Herris
 Hibet
 Hourcq
 Ménou
 Montaut
 Pourtique
 Régidou
 Séris
 Touroun
 Vignau

Neighbouring communes and villages

Toponymy
The commune name in béarnais is Arget.

Michel Grosclaude was unable to justify the local belief that the name means "sandy place" from arena (meaning "sand") with the collective suffix -etum (giving arenetum then arenet then areet then ariet), and could not conclude other than "of uncertain origin and meaning".

The following table details the origins of the commune name and other names in the commune.

Sources:

Raymond: Topographic Dictionary of the Department of Basses-Pyrenees, 1863, on the page numbers indicated in the table. 
Grosclaude: Toponymic Dictionary of communes, Béarn, 2006 

Origins:
Luntz:
Order of Malta: Titles of the Order of Malta

History
Paul Raymond noted on page 10 of his 1863 dictionary that Arget depended on the Commandery of Malta of Caubin and Morlaàs and on the Barony of Moustrou, built in 1647, and was a vassal of the Viscounts of Béarn.

Administration

List of Successive Mayors

Demography
In 2017 the commune had 78 inhabitants.

Culture and heritage

Civil heritage
Arget has many farms that are registered as historical monuments:
A Farmhouse at Hourcq (1832)
The Menusé farm at Pourtique (1897)
The Lajournade farm at Pourtique (18th century)
The Pemeste farm at Hourcq (1797)
Houses and Farms
A Farmhouse at Boué (1905)
A Farmhouse at Hibet (1871)
A Farmhouse at Carrèrot (1898)
A Farmhouse at Touroun (18th century)

Religious heritage

The Parish Church of Notre Dame (12th century) is registered as an historical monument. It contains several items that are registered as historical objects:
The Furniture in the Church
A Bronze Processional Cross (18th century)
A Wooden Processional Cross (19th century)

Notable people linked to the commune
Annie Beustes, born Annie Campagne, is a New Caledonian politician, born on 15 August 1945 in Arget.

See also
Communes of the Pyrénées-Atlantiques department

References

External links
Arget on Géoportail, National Geographic Institute (IGN) website 
Arget on the 1750 Cassini Map

Communes of Pyrénées-Atlantiques